State Route 219 (SR 219) is a state highway in the U.S. state of California that runs north of Modesto in Stanislaus County. It serves as a connector along Kiernan Avenue between State Route 99 and State Route 108.

Route description
The route begins at an interchange with SR 99 in Salida. It then heads east, out of the city, as Kiernan Avenue. The east end of SR 219 is at State Route 108 in Stanislaus County, due north of Modesto. Other than Salida, the route runs through rural farmland and does not connect between any population centers.

SR 219 is not part of the National Highway System, a network of highways that are considered essential to the country's economy, defense, and mobility by the Federal Highway Administration.

History
In 2009,  of SR 219 were expanded to 4 lanes with a center median.  As of November 2010, a study was underway to determine the feasibility of reconstructing the State Route 99/State Route 219 interchange to handle projected future demand.

In January 2015 the old Kiernan Avenue overpass for the SR 99 interchange was demolished, to make way for the new SR 99 interchange. Traffic was shifted over to a small portion of the new interchange that had been completed during the demolition, so that traffic would still be able to pass over SR 99.

June 20, 2016, marked the completion of a $42 million, three-year project to build an interchange with SR 99 in Salida. $33.4 million was paid for by the state through a bond measure while the remainder came from fees charged by Stanislaus County to developers. The new interchange provided a wider overpass, more room for entering traffic and a new bike lane.

Major intersections

See also

References

External links

California @ AARoads.com - State Route 219
Caltrans: Route 219 highway conditions
California Highways: SR 219

219
State Route 219